Neumayer-Station III, also known as Neumayer III after geophysicist Georg von Neumayer, is a German Antarctic research station of the Alfred-Wegener-Institut. The station's assembly kit was transported to its current position early in November 2007.

After almost ten years of work on the project, beginning in October 1999, including conception, environmental impact assessment, planning and construction phases, regular operation of the station began on 20 February 2009. The station replaces the Neumayer-Station II and the Georg-von-Neumayer-Station that preceded it. The expected lifespan of the station is 25 to 30 years and the entire project is estimated to cost €39 million.

Construction phase 
A garage and further technical equipment (such as PistenBully, also referred to as caterpillar trucks, Ski-Doos, etc.) are located within a subsurface snow cavern at the front of the station. The moving concrete supporting feet are powered by hydraulic machinery. Through an annual lifting procedure of  it is expected to prevent new snow from causing the platform to sink.

The station runs all year round and includes  of laboratory surface, divided into 12 compartments.  It has twice the floor area of previous stations. Within the 15 living compartments there is room for 60 occupants to sleep. All inner rooms of the platform are built as self-contained units, some of which have aligned connecting passages, depending on their size. The compartmentalized interior of the station is enclosed in sheet metal with an interior polyurethane rigid foam insulation. The green metal girders in the “structure section” image indicate snow level; they are not part of the final structure. All items below the girders will later be embedded in the Antarctic snow.

The above-surface construction method of Neumayer III is now predominant in the Antarctic, seen at other new stations such as the American Amundsen–Scott South Pole Station and the Belgian Princess Elisabeth Base.

Assembly 
A majority of the construction materials and the heavy steel frame were delivered by the end of January 2008. The plan specified that the last of the construction equipment had to leave Ekström Ice Shelf by March 2009. A crew of about 90 worked on construction.  By mid-January 2009, the exterior work on the station was completed, so that further improvement to the 99 interior containers could continue unaffected by the weather.       
Vehicles
Vehicles (such as PistenBully (which are also referred to as caterpillar trucks), Ski-Doos, snow blowers, sledges, and a kayak) are used by researchers mainly for logistics, transport, clearing snow, raising the foundation plates, and transporting equipment. They are parked in the garage when not in use or when the station is closed. The vehicles are specially adapted to tough conditions in the snow. A tracked cherry picker and a crawler crane are used for external maintenance work on the station. 
PistenBully (a.k.a. caterpillar trucks or piste bashers)
The station has about 20 PistenBully snowcats (some with extra passenger cabins, tillers, cranes, foldable winches, front shovels, buckets, and plow blades) in total. The snowcats are also referred to as caterpillar trucks or piste bashers. The PistenBully are all tracked and are mainly used by researchers for logistics supplying stations in the vicinity of researchers’ field campaigns, filling the snowmelt, clearing snow, and pulling sledges.
Ski-Doos 
The station has about 10 small ‘Ski-Doo’ snowmobiles in total. The snowmobiles are tracked and are mainly used by researchers for transport, logistics, and pulling sledges.
Snow blowers
The station has 2 small, tracked, manually operated snow blowers in the station's garage. They are mainly used for raising the station's foundation plates and digging out pits. They occasionally leave the garage.
Sledges (a.k.a. sleds) 
The station has about 100 sledges in total. They are mainly used by researchers as storerooms logistics containers, and for transport (pulling people on the sledge with a Ski-Doo). The sledges are also known as sleds and are pulled by a PistenBully snowcat or Ski-Doo.
Kayak 
A kayak is mainly used by researchers for transporting the multi-frequency EM equipment by attaching it to and pulling it behind a Ski-Doo. 
Maintenance vehicles
The station has a cherry picker with caterpillar tracks and a crawler crane for external maintenance work on the station.

Interior 
In addition to the previously mentioned laboratories and accommodation areas, there is a south-facing lounge with many windows, living quarters and workrooms, a laundry room containing two washing machines and two dryers, a sauna, an information technology room, shower and washrooms, a dining room with a serving window connected to the kitchen, a conference room, medical treatment rooms, operating rooms, storage rooms, a refrigerated area, a dressing room, a room for the heating system, a planning and training room, and a water-treatment room.
Access 
A ramp of pure snow with a hole surfaced on the ground is the main entrance and exit for vehicles entering the garage to park, or for vehicles exiting. The ramp is equipped with a lid elevated up by two inverted V-shaped objects opposite of each other on the ground that tightly seals the hole when no vehicles are entering or exiting the station's garage. The hole is sealed hydraulically by two people. 
Garage 
A garage is built beneath in the snow to park and keep the vehicles (such as PistenBully (which are also referred to as caterpillar trucks or piste bashers, Ski-Doos, etc.). The voluminous garage offers plenty of room for the  entire vehicle fleet to park. Two small snow blowers are stationed there for raising the station's foundation plates and digging out pits. The garage has additional utility and storage rooms that have been integrated into the interstitial deck.
Power unit 
An intelligent management system is located at the front of the station. It is used by researchers for regulating the station's electrical and thermal supply.
Water supply (snowmelt)
The snowmelt which is on the ground is a key source of fresh water supply for the researchers and crew. It is filled with snow by a PistenBully snow at, which is done twice a day and provides the station with clean drinking water. The snowmelt has a large retractable metal lid that can glide into the surface for snow to enter the hole.
Stairwell
A flight of stairs in a cabin with a door in the garage, as well as at the ground level, is for the researchers to access the building. Alongside the stairs, there is an elevator reaching all five decks of the station.

Data

Remote stations 
Magnetic, seismic, trace element, and acoustic research are the chief research missions of these remote stations.

Later additions 
 EDEN ISS greenhouse 
A separate hydroponics research module was added by 2018. Since winter 2018 it grows crops to test hydroponics etc. for use on Mars.

Research 
Previous Neumayer stations have been the center of continuous research since 1981, especially with respect to their observatories. In addition to the main research areas of meteorology, geophysics and atmospheric chemistry, which have been studied on the stations since the 1980s, infrasound has been studied for five years and marine acoustics since 2005.

Climate 
Neumayer Station experiences a dry-summer ice cap climate (Köppen EFs). In the winter, it is not shielded from the cold air masses of the interior, and as a consequence, on average the temperature drops to or below  10.3 times per year. It also experiences strong catabatic winds. On average, the wind speed reaches or surpasses  9 times per year. There are 1430 sunshine hours per year.

Gallery

See also
 Neumayer-Station II
 List of Antarctic research stations
 List of Antarctic field camps
 List of airports in Antarctica

References

External links 

 The New Centre of German Research in Antarctica - Neumayer Station III
 realnature.tv Video-, Foto-, und Textberichte über den Aufbau der Station in der Antarktis
 A 2019 episode of Tomorrow Today, the English-language science programme of Deutsche Welle Television, which depicts the station and interviews residents
 Video über die Station im Planet-Erde-Blog
 Animierte Infografik zur deutschen Antarktisstation Neumayer III, Tagesschau, 20. February 2009
 Neumayer III Station Webcam

 COMNAP Antarctic Facilities Map

Germany and the Antarctic
2009 establishments in Antarctica